James Conrad (born May 4, 1990) is a professional disc golfer from Blacksburg, Virginia, currently competing on the PDGA National Tour, and Disc Golf Pro Tour. He Joined the Professional Disc Golf Association in 2000 and became a professional in 2006. Conrad has won both the PDGA World Championships, in 2021, and the United States Disc Golf Championship, in 2019.

Conrad is most notable for throwing what is widely considered the most famous shot in disc golf history: a 247-foot approach shot he hit for birdie on the final hole at the 2021 PDGA Professional Disc Golf World Championship. The shot forced a playoff with Paul McBeth, which Conrad won on the first hole to secure his first world championship title.  The shot was the number one play on ESPN's SportsCenter Top 10 highlight segment, and was widely covered throughout mainstream sports media.

In 266 career PDGA events, he has 31 wins and has amassed $186,092 in winnings.

Sponsorships 
Conrad was sponsored by Innova Champion Discs starting in 2016. In January 2021 he signed a two-year sponsorship deal with MVP Disc Sports.

Majors (2)

References 

American disc golfers
People from Blacksburg, Virginia
Living people
1990 births